Jodanukar (also Romanized as Jodānūkar; also known as Jodānokar) is a village in Divshal Rural District, in the Central District of Langarud County, Gilan Province, Iran. At the 2006 census, its population was 304, in 91 families.

References 

Populated places in Langarud County